JHUD is the third studio album by American singer and actress Jennifer Hudson. It was released on September 23, 2014 by RCA Records as the follow-up to I Remember Me (2011). The album marks Hudson's first and only release through RCA following the closure of Arista and J Records.

The 1970s-inspired album has already spawned the Pharrell-produced single "I Can't Describe (The Way I Feel)" featuring T.I. and the Timbaland-produced "Walk It Out", for which she shot the music video in Chicago. On August 18, 2014, Hudson released the single, "Dangerous", via her Vevo and SoundCloud accounts. The single "It's Your World" featuring R. Kelly was nominated for a Grammy Award for Best R&B Performance. 
In 2019, as a reaction to the documentary Surviving R. Kelly, Kelly's featured song, "It's Your World", was removed from all streaming and online versions and new vinyl and CD pressings of the album. However, the Japan only bonus track "Never Give It Up" replaced "It's Your World" on all streaming and online version of the album, as the tenth track.

The single "I Still Love You" was nominated for an MTV Video Music Award for Best Video with a Message and the album was named the "Best R&B/Soul Album" by iTunes.

Background
In March 2011, Hudson released her second album I Remember Me. As with her self-titled début, Hudson worked with many different producers and songwriters on the project, resulting in a "feel good album". Upon release, it debuted at number two on the US Billboard 200 chart, with first-week sales of 165,000 copies, and was eventually certified gold by the Recording Industry Association of America (RIAA), for shipping over 500,000 copies in the United States. While not as successful as previous releases, lead single "Where You At" became a top-ten hit on the Hot R&B/Hip-Hop Songs chart, though subsequent singles failed to chart or sell noticeably. After a short musical hiatus, in which she co-starred in the films The Three Stooges (2012), The Inevitable Defeat of Mister & Pete (2013), and Black Nativity (2013), Hudson returned to music recording in mid-2013. Heading for a different direction, Hudson consulted new producers to work with her on her third album: "It's different expressions of me as an artist, a girl, a music lover. Earlier in my career I was just a soloist singing other people's songs. Now I really want to be an artist. I want to lift the people up, have fun, create a moment. I have my own visions that I want to bring to life." On the developing process of her third album, she elaborated in November 2013: "I've been working with Pharrell Williams quite a bit on my album, and Timbaland as well. This whole project this time around is extremely different and every session felt like a party, like we was getting our jam on."

Critical reception

The album received a score of 68 out of 100 on Metacritic based on 6 critical reviews, indicating "generally favorable reviews". On behalf of Billboard, Elias Leight foreseeing, "the spare templates she uses here, which are heavy on rhythm and relatively empty otherwise, give her plenty of space to flex her powerful voice." Writing for AllMusic, Andy Kellman forecasting Hudson to be "in full-on diva mode" even though she "occasionally sounds disconnected from the material, but the singer, as powerful as ever, still leaves her indelible mark on everything".

Commercial performance
JHUD debuted at number 10 on the US Billboard 200 albums chart, selling 24,000 copies in its first week of release. It marked Hudson's lowest sales and chart debut for a studio set. Previously, her 2011 album, I Remember Me, tallied her smallest start with 165,000 copies." In addition, JHUD debuted at number two on the Top R&B/Hip Hop Albums chart, becoming her third consecutive album to do so. Commenting on the album's chart performance, Paul Grein from Yahoo! Music felt that its opening sales were "a disappointment, considering that her first two albums, [..] both debuted at number two." He found that "the main problem is that the singles from this album haven't done as well as the singles from Hudson's previous albums [...] None of the first three singles from the new album has cracked the top 20 on the R&B chart." As of December 2014, JHUD has sold 61,000 copies in the US.

Track listing

Notes
 signifies a vocal producer
 signifies a co-producer

Personnel
Credits adapted from the liner notes of JHUD.

Performers and musicians

Jennifer Hudson – lead vocals, background vocals
R. Kelly – featured artist 
Iggy Azalea – featured artist 
Timbaland – featured artist 
T.I. – featured artist 
Swiss Chris – drums 
Daniel Daley – background vocals 
Akene "The Champ" Dunkley – keyboards 
"Jigga" James Edwards – additional keyboards 
Gorgon City – synths , piano , strings , bass 
Jamale Hopkins – drums 
David Jackson – keyboards 
Stephen Kozmeniuk – keyboards , drums 
Vanessa Lu – background vocals 
Mali Music – background vocals , instrumentation 
Nineteen85 – guitar , bass , drums 
Brent Paschka – electric guitar 
Brandyn Porter – guitar 
Phil Seed – guitar 
Mike Tompkins – additional vocals 
Robert Aaron Vineberg – saxophone 

Production

Arden "Keyz" Altino – co-production 
Matt Bang – recording 
Jim Beanz – vocal production , recording 
Noel "Gadget" Campbell – mixing 
Andrew Coleman – recording , digital editing , digital arrangement 
Jacob Dennis – recording assistant 
Matthew Desrameaux – recording assistant 
Jerry "Wonda" Duplessis – production 
Peter Edge – executive production
Joey "BDB" Fernandez – recording 
Serban Ghenea – mixing 
Chris Godbey – recording , mixing 
Gorgon City – production , drum programming 
Hart Gunther – recording , recording assistant 
Mick Guzauski – mixing 
John Hanes – engineering for mix 
Jerome "J-Roc" Harmon – production 
Andrew Hey – vocal recording 
Jennifer Hudson – production 
Terry Hunter – production , arrangement 
Todd Hurtt – recording assistant 
Jaycen Joshua – mixing 
Ryan Kaul – mixing assistant 
R. Kelly – additional arrangement 
Stephen Kozmeniuk – production , recording 
Dave Kutch – mastering
Jonathan Lackey – recording assistant 
Mike Larson – recording 
Mat Lejeune – recording 
Mali Music – production 
Andrea Martin – production 
Harvey Mason Jr. – vocal production 
Keith Naftaly – executive production
Nineteen85 – production 
Ramon Rivas – recording assistant 
Damien Smith – executive production
Mark "Spike" Stent – mixing 
Rob Suchecki – recording assistant 
Timbaland – production 
Serge "Sergical" Tsai – recording , mixing 
Pharrell Williams – production 

Design and management

Eric Archibald – styling
Fusako Chubachi – art direction
Yolonda Frederick – make-up
Edwin Gorostiza – art direction
Shawn Holiday – A&R
Anthony Mandler – photography
Cesar Ramirez – hair
Damien Smith – management

Charts

Weekly charts

Year-end charts

References

External links

2014 albums
Jennifer Hudson albums
Albums produced by Timbaland
Albums produced by Pharrell Williams
Albums produced by Nineteen85